Alfred John Bennett (1861 – c.1923) was an English artist who worked in oils, watercolour and etching.

Life and work

Bennett was born in London which became a major source of inspiration to the artist. His paintings, drawings and etchings, more often than not, depicted well known landmarks of the capital city. In December 1889 Bennett married Catherine Avery (They had one daughter, Mary Catherine) and spent a short amount of time living with her family in East Hyde, Bedfordshire. During this period Bennett worked as a Jeweller, whilst also regularly submitting paintings to the Royal Academy of which four were exhibited between 1861-1880.

After this success, Bennett left the jewellery trade and concentrated on his art, first moving to Thornton Heath, Surrey and then relocating his studio to Knebworth.

Exhibitions

Bennett exhibited extensively, regularly contributing work to the Royal Watercolour Society (17 pictures) and British Institution (2 pictures) exhibitions. A further painting titled The Hill Farm was exhibited at the Royal Academy in 1916, and he achieved more success with solo and joint shows at the prestigious Walker's Gallery in New Bond Street, London in 1918 and 1923. In addition, he also exhibited works at the Fine Art Society, New English Art Club, Grosvenor Gallery, International Society, and the Royal Institute of Oil Painters.

Many of Bennett's works are found in public art collections, including two watercolours in the collection of Brighton Museum & Art Gallery.

References

External links

English etchers
19th-century English painters
English male painters
20th-century English painters
Landscape artists
1861 births
1923 deaths
English watercolourists
20th-century British printmakers
Artists from London
People from Thornton Heath
People from Knebworth
19th-century English male artists
20th-century English male artists